Paul Comstive (25 November 1961 – 29 December 2013) was an English professional footballer who mainly played as a midfielder. He played in the Football League for seven different clubs and also played non-league football.

Playing career
Born in Southport, Comstive was to spend the vast majority of his career in the north-west of England, beginning as an apprentice at Blackburn Rovers in October 1979. He went on to make six league appearances for Rovers, with two loan spells with Rochdale following before a move to Wigan Athletic in August 1983.

After a three-year stint with Wrexham from 1984 to 1987, Comstive made an £8,000 switch to Burnley. This spell saw him play at Wembley Stadium in the 1988 Associate Members' Cup Final against Wolverhampton Wanderers.

Comstive moved on again in 1989 to Bolton Wanderers for £37,000, with his two seasons at Burnden Park ending in losses in the Third Division play–offs. Two of the three goals he scored for Bolton came direct from corner kicks in the 4–1 home win against Bournemouth in January 1991. Later that year he was to help Wanderers towards the divisional Play-offs where they eventually lost out to Tranmere Rovers at Wembley Stadium. In November 1991 Comstive moved to Chester City for £10,000. He scored in the first Football League match at the Deva Stadium between Chester and Burnley on 5 September 1992 but was released at the end of the 1992–93 season. Many of his appearances for Chester came at full-back.

This marked the end of Comstive's professional career. He joined hometown club Southport and went on to play for fellow non-league clubs Morecambe and Chorley. Comstive had a short spell on the coaching staff at Southport and also worked for Burscough. He later worked at Fleetwood Hesketh FC and at Royal Mail as a postman.

On 29 December 2013, he died suddenly following a heart attack.

References

External links

Bolton Wanderers career details
Burnley career details
A–Z of Wigan Athletic players

1961 births
2013 deaths
English footballers
Footballers from Southport
English Football League players
National League (English football) players
Association football midfielders
Association football fullbacks
Blackburn Rovers F.C. players
Rochdale A.F.C. players
Wigan Athletic F.C. players
Wrexham A.F.C. players
Burnley F.C. players
Bolton Wanderers F.C. players
Chester City F.C. players
Southport F.C. players
Morecambe F.C. players
Chorley F.C. players